Edward Barnard was a politician from Quebec, Canada and a Member of the Legislative Assembly of Lower Canada.

Background

He was born around 1806. A son, Édouard-André Barnard, gained some notability as a militia officer in Lower Canada.

Member of the legislature

He ran as a Patriote candidate in the district of Trois-Rivières in 1834 and won.  His tenure came to an end on March 27, 1838 when the constitution that ruled the colony was suspended.

Rebellions of 1837

He was arrested in November 1838 for his involvement in the Rebellions of 1837 and put in jail in Montreal, but was released in December of the same year.

Retirement from Politics

Barnard eventually made a career as a clerk of court in the Mauricie area and retired in 1878.  He died in the United States in June 1885.

Footnotes

Members of the Legislative Assembly of Lower Canada
1800s births
1885 deaths

fr:Edward Barnard